Igor is a tiny crater on the Moon. It is near the site where Soviet lunar rover Lunokhod 1 landed in November 1970, in the Mare Imbrium region. Its diameter is 0.1 km. The name Igor does not refer to a specific person; it is a Russian male name, derived from the Norse name Ingvar.

References

External links

Igor at The Moon Wiki
 
 

Impact craters on the Moon
Mare Imbrium